Adromischus is a genus of flowering plants. They are easily-propagated, leaf succulents from the family Crassulaceae, which are endemic to southern Africa. The name comes from the ancient Greek adros (=thick) and mischos (=stem).

Species 
The species of Adromischus are divided into five sections, based on their shared characteristics and relationships:

Section 1 (Adromischus) 

Flowers bright green, tubular, with short, wide, triangular, recurved lobes. Anthers protrude from a flower tube. Indigenous mainly to the western, winter-rainfall regions of South Africa.
 Adromischus alstonii
 Adromischus bicolor
 Adromischus filicaulis
 Adromischus filicaulis subsp. marlothii
 Adromischus hemisphaericus
 Adromischus liebenbergii
 Adromischus liebenbergii subsp. orientalis
 Adromischus montium-klinghardtii
 Adromischus roanianus
 Adromischus subdistichus

Section 2 (Boreali) 
Grooved, tubular flowers, with ovate-triangular, recurved lobes that are undulated on the margins. Anthers protrude from flower tube. Indigenous to the arid, summer-rainfall interior of Southern Africa.
 Adromischus schuldtianus
 Adromischus schuldtianus subs. juttae
 Adromischus schuldtianus subs. brandbergensis
 Adromischus trigynus
 Adromischus umbraticola
 Adromischus umbraticola subs. ramosus

Section 3 (Brevipedunculati) 
Grooved, funnel-shaped flowers with acuminate-triangular, widely spreading lobes, born on long stalks. Inflorescence branched. Usually spreading or stoloniferous plants.
 Adromischus caryophyllaceus
 Adromischus diabolicus
 Adromischus fallax
 Adromischus humilis
 Adromischus nanus
 Adromischus phillipsiae

Section 4 (Incisilobati) 

Tubular flowers with elongated lanceolate-triangular lobes. Plants with short, compact, upright stems.
 Adromischus halesowensis
 Adromischus inamoenus
 Adromischus maculatus
 Adromischus mammilaris
 Adromischus maximus
 Adromischus sphenophyllus
 Adromischus triflorus

Section 5 (Longipedunculati) 

Pale or pubescent inflorescence with elongated, lanceolate-triangular lobes.
 Adromischus cooperi
 Adromischus cristatus
 Adromischus cristatus var. clavifolius
 Adromischus cristatus var. mzimvubuensis
 Adromischus cristatus var. schonlandii
 Adromischus cristatus var. zeyheri
 Adromischus leucophyllus
 Adromischus marianiae
 Adromischus marianiae var. hallii
 Adromischus marianiae var. immaculatus
 Adromischus marianiae var. kubusensis
 Adromischus marianiae 'Alveolatus'
 Adromischus marianiae 'Antidorcatum'
 Adromischus marianiae 'Bryan Makin'
 Adromischus marianiae 'Herrei'
 Adromischus marianiae 'Little Spheroid'
 Adromischus marianiae 'Red Mutation'
 Adromischus marianiae 'Tanqua'
Adromischus subviridis

So-called Adromischus oviforme specimens are actually Adromischus filicaulis subsp. marlothii; Adromischus oviforme doesn't actually exist.

Species gallery

References

External links 
 
 

 
Crassulaceae genera